Contact II is an outdoor 1972 abstract sculpture by Russian American artist Alexander Liberman, located at Jamison Square in the Pearl District, Portland, Oregon.

Description
The painted steel sculpture measures  x  x  and was donated by Ed Cauduro in 2002 in memory of his parents Ernest and Teresa Cauduro. It is part of the City of Portland and Multnomah County Public Art Collection courtesy of the Regional Arts & Culture Council. According to The Culture Trip, Contact II is "representative of Liberman's oeuvre as it is painted in red and its form centres on a circular shape, both of which were often repeated in his works".

See also

 1972 in art

References

External links
 Contact II at the Public Art Archive
 A Guide to Portland Public Art (PDF), Regional Arts & Culture Council

1972 sculptures
Abstract sculptures in Oregon
Outdoor sculptures in Portland, Oregon
Pearl District, Portland, Oregon
Sculptures by Alexander Liberman
Steel sculptures in Oregon